The Victorian Maritime Centre is an Australian maritime museum near Melbourne, Victoria, Australia. It is currently located at the former BP administration building at Crib Point, Victoria. There are plans to establish a larger maritime centre in Hastings, Victoria. The new site would feature  HMAS Otama, an Oberon-class submarine operated by the Royal Australian Navy from 1978 to 2000. The Otama was moored offshore at Crib Point since 2002. She has now arrived in Western Australia for scrapping. The ship Wyuna is also planned to be displayed at the centre. For a time she was docked at Beauty Point, Tasmania, and after being refurbished for 18 months she was to be moved to Docklands in Melbourne, Victoria. After this berth became unavailable, the vessel was docked at Inspection Head Wharf in Beauty Point. After a period there, she was towed into Bell Bay where she lays at anchor as of January 2016.

The planned display of the vessels would have the Otama displayed out of the water, with the Wyuna in a wet berth alongside it.

References

External links
 Official homepage

Naval museums
Military and war museums in Australia
Maritime museums in Victoria (Australia)